Reversible Errors is a 2004 American made-for-television crime thriller film based on the 2002 novel of the same name by Scott Turow. It was directed by Mike Robe, who previously directed Scott Turow's The Burden of Proof, and stars Tom Selleck and William H. Macy. Filming was done in and around Halifax, Nova Scotia, and featured shots of Halifax City Hall and Angus L. Macdonald Bridge.

The film was first shown by CBS in two parts on May 23 and 25, 2004. Channel 5 in the United Kingdom has chosen to show it as a single 173 minute film.

Plot
A young woman and two other people are killed in a Kindle County local  bar. Experienced detective sergeant Larry Starczek (Tom Selleck) begins investigation on the murders. Soon everything points to the small-time thief Squirrel. Larry arrests him and makes the thief confess. After a short trial Squirrel goes to the prison where he will be executed.

The story now moves seven years later, as new evidence surfaces. Nobody is so sure any more that it was Squirrel who actually killed those three people years ago. Furthermore, it seems that the judge from his trial wasn't completely clean.

Cast

 William H. Macy ...  Arthur Raven 
 Tom Selleck ...  Larry Starczek 
 Monica Potter ...  Muriel Wynn 
 Felicity Huffman ...  Gillian Sullivan 
 James Rebhorn ...  Erno Erdai 
 Shemar Moore ...  Collins Farwell 
 Glenn Plummer ...  Squirrel / Romeo Gandolf 
 Yanna McIntosh ...  Genevieve Carriere
 Nigel Bennett ...  Talmadge Loman 
 David Fox ...  Judge Harlow 
 Deborah Allen ...  Waitress 
 Mauralea Austin ...  Tina - Bistro Woman 
 Doug Barron ...  Funeral Reporter 
 Robert Bockstael ...  Detective 
 Ray Brimicombe ...  Judge Harlow's Bailiff 
 Ron Canada ...  Jackson Aires 
 Eugene Clark ...  Chief Harold Greer 
 Stephen Coats ...  Gala Host 
 Christina Collins ...  Louisa Remardi 
 Roger Dunn ...  Leo Carnahan 
 John Dunsworth ...  Ike 
 John Evans ...  Tom Woznicki 
 Brian Heighton ...  Paul Judson 
 Martha Irving ...  Woznicki's Woman 
 Eric Lemoine ...  Forensic Officer 
 Gary Levert ...  Evidence Room Officer 
 Rhonda McLean ...  Marta Stern 
 Gerry Mendicino ...  Gus Leonidas 
 Frank Nakashima ...  Daniel 'Painless' Kumagi 
 Michael Pellerin ...  Jail Deputy 
 Juanita Peters ...  Female Guard 
 Nancy Regan ...  Reporter 
 Allan Royal ...  O'Grady 
 Shawn Tanaka ...  Prisoner 
 Ian Tench ...  Judge Sullivan's Bailiff 
 Robert Verlaque ...  Dickerman

Home media
Reversible Errors was released on DVD in the United States on October 12, 2004.

References

External links

Kindle County
2004 television films
2004 films
Films based on American novels
Works by Scott Turow
CBS network films
Films directed by Mike Robe
2000s English-language films